"Love Is a Hurtin' Thing" is a 1966 pop/soul single by Lou Rawls and was written by Ben Raleigh (1913-1997) & Dave Linden (pseudonym used by David J. Luff).
The single was his second entry on the R&B singles chart as well as his first Top 40 hit on the Billboard Hot 100 pop chart. "Love Is a Hurtin' Thing" was the first of two Lou Rawls singles to make it to number one on the R&B chart.

Chart positions

Cover versions
Big Maybelle covered the song in 1967, included on her album Got A Brand New Bag. 
J.J. Jackson also covered the song in 1967, included on his But It's Alright album. 
Buddy Greco recorded a version that lasted for nearly six and a half minutes. It was on his Let the Sunshine In album which was released in 1969. 
Marcia Hines covered the song in 1977, included on her Ladies and Gentlemen album.

References

1966 singles
Lou Rawls songs
Marcia Hines songs
1966 songs
Songs with lyrics by Ben Raleigh